The Bishop of the Isles or Bishop of Sodor was the ecclesiastical head of the Diocese of the Isles (or Sodor), one of Scotland's thirteen medieval bishoprics. The bishopric, encompassing both the Hebrides and Mann, probably traces its origins as an ecclesiastical unity to the careers of Olaf, King of the Isles, and Bishop Wimund. Previously, there had been numerous bishoprics, and recorded bishoprics include Kingarth, Iona, Skye and Mann. There were very likely numerous others.

List of precursor bishoprics

List of known bishops of Iona

List of known bishops of Cenn Garad
Kingarth was a church on the Isle of Bute, supposedly founded by Saint Chattan and Saint Blane. Three abbots are known, but only two bishops. Sadly, little is known about the abbey, bishopric and individual clerics.

List of known bishops of Mann

Bishops of the Isles

List of known bishops of Isles (including Mann)

The list of bishops known to have ruled the whole of what became the Diocese of the Isles (Sodor).

List of bishops of the Isles (excluding Mann)
The bishopric of the Isles became divided, primarily because the see became divided between the kings of England and Scotland. The English had taken over Mann, leaving the other islands to the north under Scottish overlordship.

Notes

References

 Anderson, Alan Orr, Early Sources of Scottish History: AD 500–1286, 2 Vols, (Edinburgh, 1922).
 Anderson, Alan Orr, Scottish Annals from English Chroniclers: AD 500–1286, (London, 1908), republished, Marjorie Anderson (ed.) (Stamford, 1991)
 
 
 Oram, Richard, The Lordship of Galloway, (Edinburgh, 2000)
 Watt, D. E. R., "Bishops in the Isles before 1203: Bibliography and Biographical Lists", in The Innes Review, Volume 45, 1994, pp. 99–119

External links
 Annals of the Four Masters
 Translation
 Annals of Ulster
 Translation

History of the Scottish Highlands
History of the Inner Hebrides
Iona
Christianity in the Isle of Man
Religion in the Outer Hebrides
Religion in Argyll and Bute
Religion in Highland (council area)
People associated with Highland (council area)

History of the Outer Hebrides
Pre-Reformation bishops in Scotland